Lumbwa is a settlement in Kenya's Rift Valley Province.

See also 

 Railway stations in Kenya
 Lumbwa people

References 

Populated places in Rift Valley Province